The Lovers is a public art work by artist Lindsay Daen located at the Lynden Sculpture Garden near Milwaukee, Wisconsin. The sculpture depicts two elongated figures walking hand in hand; it is installed on the lawn.

References

1964 establishments in Wisconsin
1964 sculptures
Bronze sculptures in Wisconsin
Outdoor sculptures in Milwaukee
Statues in Wisconsin